Deirdre Heenan is a former Pro-Vice-Chancellor of Ulster University and a former Provost of the University's Coleraine and Magee campuses. Prof Heenan was also appointed to the Council of State by the President of Ireland, Michael D. Higgins in 2012. She was appointed Lecturer in Policy Studies at the University of Ulster in 1995, becoming a Professor in 2007.

References

External links
Ulster University
Website of the President of Ireland

Living people
People associated with Ulster University
Presidential appointees to the Council of State (Ireland)
Year of birth missing (living people)